Vrigne may refer to two communes in the Ardennes department in northern France:
 Vrigne-aux-Bois
 Vrigne-Meuse